Imparja Television Pty Ltd is a commercial television company servicing remote eastern and central Australia that began broadcasting on 2 January 1988. It is based in Alice Springs, where it has a studio and satellite uplink facility. It is controlled by Indigenous Australians and is widely regarded as a symbol of Aboriginal Australia.

The company produces one channel, Imparja Television. From the late 1990s to 2007, it also produced an additional channel, the Aboriginal content on it becoming known as ICTV, which was closed on 12 July 2007 to make way for the National Indigenous Television service.

Shareholders
Central Land Council
Tiwi Land Council
Northern Land Council
Warlpiri Media Association
Pitjantjatjara Council
Top End Aboriginal Bush Broadcasting Association (TEABBA)
Maralinga Tjarutja Trust

External links
Official Website

Television production companies of Australia
Indigenous Australian television
Mass media in Alice Springs